Rosies of the North (French-language title: Riveuses du nord) is a 46-minute Canadian documentary film made in 1999 by the National Film Board of Canada (NFB) and directed by Kelly Saxberg. The film recounts the story of the women at the Canadian Car and Foundry in Fort William, Ontario, who built fighter and bomber aircraft needed for the war effort in the Second World War. It also is the story of female engineer Elsie MacGill, who became known as the "Queen of the Hurricanes". The title of the film is an allusion to the wartime iconic image of Rosie the Riveter.

Synopsis 

In 1939, Canada joined the worldwide war effort with factories turning out war machines. At the Canadian Car and Foundry (nicknamed "Can-Car") in Fort William, Ontario, a large workforce was recruited to build the Hawker Hurricane fighter aircraft, including a preponderance of women. Many of them were young, and came from as far away as the Prairies.

Of the 7,000 workers at Can-Car, 3,000 were women on the shop floor; initially, they were not treated with respect. Men typically were the "lead-hands", more experienced workers who would train, at least at first, the new women trainees. It was soon evident that women reacted much more favourably to other women as their mentors and instructors.

For a while, the animosity between the men and women was palpable. One "old hand" who showed his dislike by refusing to let women sign out before him, ensured the first seats on the buses leaving the factory were then occupied by the men. They steadfastly refused to give up their seats, leaving the women "hanging on by the straps". The obstinate fellow came on board after women welded his lunchbox to a piece of steel.

Eventually, the factory assigned female "matrons" to look after the women, acting as nurses, nannies and "cops". The factory called them "intelligent, likeable, friendly women," while the women knew that the matrons were there to "keep them in line," and not "tempt the men". Women still made less than the men whom they had often trained, and married women were summarily dismissed, but some of them kept their marriages secret and worked anyway.

The one woman "boss" at the factory was Elsie MacGill, who was first in charge of the production of fighter aircraft, and heralded in the press as the "Queen of the Hurricanes".  By the time the production line shut down in 1943, Can-Car had produced over 1,400 Hurricanes. Just as the factory was re-tooling for production of Curtiss SB2C Helldiver torpedo and dive bomber aircraft for the United States Navy, MacGill and the works manager, E. J. (Bill) Soulsby, were dismissed. It was later revealed they were having an affair (and subsequently married).

The women on the shop floor continued on until the end of the war, when most of them relinquished their jobs as the men came home. At the refurbished Can-Car plant, now building rolling stock and buses, 60 years later, the women came back to the factory to remember when they "had the greatest experience of their lives". For the reunion, a highlight was the arrival of a restored Curtiss Helldiver which did a flypast with one of the original women factory workers, Margaret Cook (née Nixon) on board.

Cast
(Interview subjects)

 Muriel Baily, former engineering secretary
 George Bicknell, former assistant to E. J. Soulsby
 Jim Carmichael, former engineer
 Margaret (Nixon) Cook, former welder
 Irene dePureau, former welder
 Helen Gural, former engineering secretary
 Lauretta Breckon Jones, former riveter
 Elsie MacGill, former chief engineer
 Nina (Harney) Godecki, former riveter
 Dr. Lorna Marsden, MacGill family friend
 Alan Norton, former engineer
 Elsie Schneewind, Elsie MacGill's  niece
 Ann Soulsby, E. J. Soulsby's step-daughter
 E. J. (Bill) Soulsby, former factory manager
 Mary Sundell, former riveter
 Alice Taylor, former wiring department worker

Production
Director Kelly Saxberg was able to access archival footage from the NFB wartime archives that showed not only the production effort of aviation companies, but also newsreels such as Night Shift (1942) and To The Ladies (1946) that dealt with the issues of women and men in the workforce. With the return of men from the war, women came under intense pressure to return to running households. Rosies of the North also had the benefit of gathering first-hand interviews at a reunion of Can-Car workers that coincided with the "Thunder in the Air Air Show" held on August 29, 1998, at Thunder Bay, Ontario.

Reception
Rosies of the North quickly found favour with viewers and has been broadcast on at least eight networks in North America. Librarian Joan Payzant, in her review for CM magazine, observed, "Highly recommended viewing, illustrating an important side of life in Canada during the Second World War." She also indicated that seniors "... will appreciate the nostalgia in the film."

In a detailed analysis of Rosies of the North, Professor David Frank, noted: "The film treatment cuts back and forth between present and past as the women review the evidence of their experience and share personal observations. As such it seems very much an exercise in a visual form of oral history." He agreed that the film left it up to the viewer to decide whether the gains made in the industrial workplace were fleeting. One of the most poignant still photographs shown in the film is a postwar image, as the camera closes up on a sign that the formerly employed female workers hold up. It says: "We want work".

See also
 The Life and Times of Rosie the Riveter, a 1980 American documentary film

References

Notes

Citations

Bibliography

 Bourgeois-Doyle, Richard I. Her Daughter the Engineer: The Life of Elsie Gregory MacGill. Ottawa: NRC Research Press, 2008. .
 Wakewich, Patricia. " 'Queen of the Hurricanes': Elsie Gregory MacGill, aeronautical engineer and women's advocate." in Cook, Sharon Anne, Lorna R. McLean and  Kate O'Rourke, eds. Framing Our Past: Canadian Women's History in the Twentieth Century. Montreal: McGill-Queen's University Press, 2006, First edition 2001. .

External links
 
 Short profile of MacGill Canada's Aviation Hall of Fame
 Watch Rosies of the North at NFB.ca.

1999 films
Canadian aviation films
Canadian documentary films
Documentary films about military aviation
English-language Canadian films
National Film Board of Canada documentaries
1999 documentary films
Films shot in Ontario
Aviation in Ontario
Documentary films about women in World War II
Canadian women in World War II
1990s English-language films
1990s Canadian films